Azernashr is a major publishing house in Azerbaijan. It is the official state publishing house, based in Baku.

Azerneshr started its operations in 1923. Within the period of existence, the publishing house produced tens of thousands of books in different subjects. It has published a number of books in Russian, English, French and other languages. Apart from major European languages, Azerneshr also publishes in languages of minorities such as Talysh, Tat, Lezgi, Kurdish, Udi and Khinalug languages.

References

Publishing companies established in 1923
Publishing companies of Azerbaijan
1923 establishments in the Soviet Union
Publishing companies of the Soviet Union